Eduard Bona-Bunić (1894 – 2 October 1944 in Travnik) was a Croatian World War II soldier and member of the Bunić family, an old Austro-Hungarian noble family.

Bona-Bunić served as pukovnik konjanički (colonel of cavalry) in the Croatian Home Guard. From September 1943 he was in command of the II. konjanički sklop (II. Cavalry Group). He later joined the Brzi zdrug (Mobile Brigade), and commanded the unit at the defense of Travnik. Yugoslav Partisans took the town, resulting in Bona Bunić leading one last defense which resulted in his death on 2 October 1944.

In 1943, Bona Bunić was decorated with the Military Order of the Iron Trefoil Fourth Class and the Order of the Crown of King Zvonimir Third Class. He was posthumously promoted to general and awarded the Golden Ante Pavelić Medal for Bravery.

References

1894 births
1944 deaths
People from Travnik
Austro-Hungarian military personnel of World War I
Royal Yugoslav Army personnel
Croatian collaborators with Fascist Italy
Croatian collaborators with Nazi Germany
Croatian Home Guard personnel
Croatian military personnel killed in World War II
Recipients of the Medal of Poglavnik Ante Pavelić for Bravery
Recipients of the Order of the Crown of King Zvonimir
Recipients of the Military Order of the Iron Trefoil
People killed by Yugoslav Partisans